Louis Vitucci (born December 14, 1940) is an American diver. He competed in the men's 10 metre platform event at the 1964 Summer Olympics.

References

1940 births
Living people
American male divers
Olympic divers of the United States
Divers at the 1964 Summer Olympics
Sportspeople from Mount Vernon, New York